There are over 20,000 Grade II* listed buildings in England.  This page is a list of these buildings in the county of West Midlands, by district.

Birmingham

|}

City of Wolverhampton

|}

Coventry

Dudley

|}

Sandwell

|}

Solihull

|}

Walsall

|}

See also
Grade I listed buildings in the West Midlands
Listed pubs in Birmingham

Notes

References 
National Heritage List for England

External links

West Midlands
 
Lists of listed buildings in the West Midlands (county)